Parliamentary elections were held in Chile on 7 March 1915.  The Conservative Party received the most votes in the Chamber of Deputies elections.

Results

Chamber of Deputies

Chamber of Senators

References

Elections in Chile
1915 in Chile
Chile
March 1915 events
Election and referendum articles with incomplete results